The South Moccasin Mountains,  el. , is a small mountain range northwest of Lewistown, Montana in Fergus County, Montana.

See also
 List of mountain ranges in Montana

Notes

Mountain ranges of Montana
Landforms of Fergus County, Montana